The Renault R202 was the car with which the Renault team competed in the 2002 Formula One World Championship. It was the first Renault Formula One car following the French manufacturer's rebranding of the Benetton team. The car was driven by Briton Jenson Button, who was retained from 2001, and Italian Jarno Trulli, who joined the team from Jordan. The test driver was Spaniard Fernando Alonso, who signed from Minardi.

Overview
The R202 was Renault's official return to Formula One as a chassis maker and full team for 2002. The R202 was launched in Paris, France on 27 January 2002.  Benetton, the team they had purchased, were fully rebranded into the Renault family with the car featuring prominent yellow streaks against pale blue.  The blue for returning lead sponsor, Mild Seven.

The chassis was designed by Mike Gascoyne with support from Bob Bell, Tim Densham, John Iley and Pat Symonds. The R202 was an aerodynamic development of the 2001 car, building on the gains made from their extensive wind tunnel testing.  The R202 featured Renault's RS22 V10 engine, featuring a unique 112° degree cylinder bank angle featuring a lower centre of gravity than any other F1 engine at the time. The RS22 engine powering the R202 had an output of 825 hp at 17,500rpm. The R202 utilised Michelin tyres, an agreement reached prior to the French companies return to F1 in 2001.

The R202 was formally tested ahead of the Australian Grand Prix at Silverstone by race team drivers Trulli and Button. Chassis 1, 2 and 3 were all utilised ahead of the first race. Reserve driver, Fernando Alonso continued testing parts for the R202 at Silverstone into March.

The season started poorly for Renault in Australia. Both Button and Trulli were eliminated due to collisions, and by Lap 9 had no runners in the field. Trulli retired from the next two Grand Prix, whilst Button finished in fourth place in both Grand Prix, scoring valuable points, and again in San Marino achieving fifth place. At the Spanish round, both Button and Trulli retired from the race but were classified due to completing more than 90% of race distance. Button was heading for a career first podium finish. A further retirement in Austria meant that Trulli had only crossed the finish line in one Grand Prix driving the R202.

At Monaco, Trulli's fortunes turned and the R202 scored a fourth-place finish, and at the next race in Canada scoring a point for sixth place. However, he would retire from a further five Grand Prix driving the R202 including Renault's home race at France where Button secured a point for finishing in sixth.

Trulli and Button took the R202 to its only double points finish at the 2002 Italian Grand Prix in Monza despite both having qualified outside the top ten/

Despite the reliability challenges, the R202 took Renault to fourth place in the World Constructors Championship standings at the end of the season with 23 points.  Button scoring 14, and Trulli 9 the pair finishing seventh and eighth in the drivers standings.

The R202 would be Button's final season driving for Renault in his Formula One career. He departed for British American Racing.

Complete Formula One results
(key) (Results in bold indicate pole position; results in italics indicate fastest lap)

References

R202
2002 Formula One season cars